Caledomedes is a genus of nursery web spiders containing the single species, Caledomedes flavovittatus. It was  first described by Robert J. Raven & W. Hebron in 2018, and is only found in New Caledonia.

References

External links

Monotypic Araneomorphae genera
Pisauridae